
Vinal may refer to:

People
 Arthur H. Vinal (1854-1923), American architect 
 Robert A. Vinal (1821-1887), American businessman
 William G. Vinal (1881–1976), American outdoors educator
 Vinal G. Good (1906-2000), American politician

Places
 Vinal Avenue, Somerville, Massachusetts, United States:
 House at 42 Vinal Avenue
 House at 49 Vinal Avenue
 Vinal Haven, Maine, United States

Other
 Vinal Technical High School, Middletown, Connecticut, United States

See also
 Vinall, a surname
 Vinyl (disambiguation)